Phillips County Carnegie Library is a Carnegie library on the National Register of Historic Places located in Malta, Montana. It was added to the Register on August 27, 1980. For a time, it was used as a museum interpreting local history.

It was built of tan brick on a stone foundation in 1917.

The public library moved to a new location in May 1978, and the local historical society then planned to use this building as a museum.

References

Libraries on the National Register of Historic Places in Montana
Carnegie libraries in Montana
National Register of Historic Places in Phillips County, Montana
Library buildings completed in 1917
1917 establishments in Montana